Horacio de la Peña was the defending champion, but lost in the third round to Francisco Clavet.

Karel Nováček won the title by defeating Magnus Gustafsson 7–6(7–2), 7–6(7–4), 6–2 in the final.

Seeds
All seeds received a bye to the second round.

Draw

Finals

Top half

Section 1

Section 2

Bottom half

Section 3

Section 4

References

External links
 Official results archive (ATP)
 Official results archive (ITF)

Singles
Austrian Open Kitzbühel